The payroll vote is a term in the British parliamentary system for Members of Parliament who concurrently hold Government positions. It includes ministers and Parliamentary Private Secretaries. Even though the last are unpaid, they are widely regarded as being on the "first rung of the ministerial ladder". There is a commonly-observed convention in the British constitution that all government ministers, including the Prime Minister, be members of either the House of Commons or the House of Lords, although this is not always strictly observed.

Under the principle of Cabinet collective responsibility, all ministers must publicly support the position of the Government. Any minister who wishes to vote against the Government in Parliament is obliged to resign from governmental office first. There is therefore a built-in bloc of guaranteed support for the Government on any given parliamentary vote. However, in the votes in the House of Commons on Brexit during the week of 11 March 2019, cabinet MPs voted against the government (and their own) stance without facing any public questioning from Theresa May.

The size of this bloc is substantial and has been increasing over time. Immediately after the 2005 general election, there were 89 ministers and 51 parliamentary private secretaries in the Commons, accounting for 40% of Labour Members of Parliament.

References

Parliament of the United Kingdom